Dog Eats Rabbit is the follow-up album by Blackburner to From Dusk to Dub. This album is a collaboration with DMX.

Track listing

Personnel 
 Blackburner
 DMX
 Brain Perera – Executive Producer

References

External links 
</ref>

2017 albums
Blackburner albums
DMX (rapper) albums